Lee Eisenberg (born April 5, 1977) is an American film and television writer and producer. He usually works with Gene Stupnitsky, with whom he founded Quantity Entertainment.

Life and career
Eisenberg was born in Needham, Massachusetts. His father is an immigrant from Israel. He graduated from Connecticut College in 1999, after which he wrote the independent short film "Flush," and was once a contestant on the game show Pyramid.

Television
In 2005, Eisenberg and Stupnitsky joined the staff of the NBC comedy series The Office, where they remained from seasons 2 to 6. In addition to writing, he served as a co-executive producer and directed two episodes with Stupnitsky, "Michael Scott Paper Company" and "The Lover". Although he is not credited for directing "Michael Scott Paper Company", similarly Stupnitsky is not credited for directing "The Lover", as only one person can be credited with directing the episode. They also directed The Outburst, a webisode series for The Office. He also acted as one of the Vance Refrigeration delivery guys (Gino), along with Stupnitsky, present in several episodes of The Office.

In 2013, Eisenberg and Stupnitsky had a busy year in television, and were listed as two of Deadline Hollywood's "Overachievers" of pilot season. Along with Stephen Merchant, they created, executive produced, and wrote for the HBO series Hello Ladies, which ran for one season and concluded with a feature-length special. That same year, they wrote a pilot for ABC based on the popular BBC series Pulling, in addition to serving as executive producers on the series Trophy Wife on ABC. They also executive produced the series Bad Teacher for CBS, which is based on their original screenplay.

Film
Eisenberg and Stupnitsky have worked together on several screenplays, many of which they have produced as well. Along with Harold Ramis, they wrote the screenplay for Year One, which starred Jack Black and Michael Cera, and was released in 2009. Following that, they wrote and produced the film Bad Teacher, which starred Cameron Diaz and Justin Timberlake. They were to serve as producers of a proposed sequel.

Eisenberg and Stupnitsky wrote a screenplay for Ghostbusters III that was not used for the franchise. The duo also wrote the screenplay for Good Boys, which was released in 2019.

Filmography
Film

Television

References

External links
 

American television writers
American male television writers
American people of Israeli descent
Jewish American writers
Connecticut College alumni
Living people
Place of birth missing (living people)
Writers Guild of America Award winners
1977 births
21st-century American Jews